Rashid Aushev Central Stadium is a multi-use stadium in Nazran, Russia. It is currently used mostly for football matches and is the home ground of FC Angusht Nazran.  The stadium holds 3,200 people.

References

Football venues in Russia
Nazran
Buildings and structures in Ingushetia
Sport in Ingushetia